The Ministry of Labour, Immigration, Training and Skills Development is responsible for labour issues in the Canadian province of Ontario.

The Ministry of Labour, Immigration, Training and Skills Development and its agencies are responsible for employment equity and rights, occupational health and safety, labour relations, and supporting apprenticeships, the skilled trades, and industry training. The ministry’s three program responsibilities are delivered from a head office in Toronto and 19 offices organized around four regions, centred in Ottawa, Hamilton, Sudbury and Toronto.  As well, the ministry oversees the work of eight specialized agencies.

The current minister of labour, immigration, training and skills development is Monte McNaughton.

History
The Province entered the field in 1882 with the creation of the Bureau of Industries, which was attached to the Department of the Commissioner of Agriculture. In 1900, it was transferred to the Department of the Commissioner of Public Works and renamed as the Bureau of Labour, which subsequently became the Trades and Labour Branch in 1916.

In 1919, the Conservative government of William Howard Hearst secured passage of an Act to raise the Branch into a Cabinet-level department to be known as the Department of Labour. Finlay MacDiarmid, the Minister of Public Works, was appointed the first Minister of Labour as well, but the first full-time minister was Walter Rollo of the Independent Labour Party in the government of E.C. Drury that took office after  the Conservative defeat in the 1919 general election.

In 1972, as part of a general reorganization of departments initiated by the government of Bill Davis, the Department was renamed the Ministry of Labour.

In 2019, the Ministry of Labour changed its name to Ministry of Labour, Training and Skills Development to reflect its expanding mandate of training, apprenticeships and Employment Ontario.

Following the 2022 provincial election, the ministry was renamed to Ministry of Labour, Immigration, Training and Skills Development.

List of Ministers
Minister of Labour
 Walter Rollo, 1919–1923
 Forbes Elliott Godfrey, 1923–1930
 Joseph Dunsmore Monteith, 1930–1934
 John Morrow Robb, 1934 (January–July)
 Mitchell Frederick Hepburn, 1937 (April–October)
 Norman Otto Hipel, 1938–1941
 Charles Daley, 1943–1961
 Bill Warrender, 1961–1962
 Leslie Rowntree, 1962–1966
 Dalton Bales, 1966–1971
 Gordon Carton, 1971–1972
 Fernand Guindon, 1972–1974
 John Palmer MacBeth, 1974–1975
 Bette Stephenson, 1975–1978
 Robert Elgie, 1978–1982 
 Russ Ramsay, 1982–1985
 Robert Elgie, 1985 (May–June)
 Bill Wrye, 1985–1989
 Greg Sorbara, 1987–1989
 Gerry Phillips, 1989–1990
 Bob Mackenzie, 1990–1994
 Shirley Coppen, 1994–1995
 Elizabeth Witmer, 1995–1997
 Jim Flaherty, 1997–1999
 Chris Stockwell, 1999–2002
 Brad Clark, 2002–2003
 Chris Bentley, 2003–2005
 Steve Peters, 2005–2007
 Brad Duguid, 2007–2008
 Peter Fonseca, 2008–2010
 Charles Sousa, 2010–2011
 Linda Jeffrey, 2011–2013
 Yasir Naqvi, 2013–2014
 Kevin Flynn, 2014–2018
 Laurie Scott, 2018-2019
 Monte McNaughton, 2019
Minister of Labour, Training and Skills Development
 Monte McNaughton, 2019–2022
Minister of Labour, Immigration, Training and Skills Development

 Monte McNaughton, 2022

References

External links
 

Ontario,Labour
Ontario
Labour
Ontario
1919 establishments in Ontario